Ernesto Herrero (born 16 September 1893, date of death unknown) was a Cuban sports shooter. He competed in the 25 m pistol event at the 1952 Summer Olympics.

References

1893 births
Year of death missing
Cuban male sport shooters
Olympic shooters of Cuba
Shooters at the 1952 Summer Olympics
Sportspeople from Camagüey